The Kansas State Capitol, known also as the Kansas Statehouse, is the building housing the executive and legislative branches of government for the U.S. state of Kansas. Located in the city of Topeka, which has served as the capital of Kansas since the territory became a state in 1861, the building is the second to serve as the Kansas Capitol. During the territorial period (1854–1861), an earlier capitol building was begun but not completed in Lecompton, Kansas, and smaller structures in Lecompton and Topeka were where the territorial legislatures met (see Capitols of Kansas).

It is one of the few capitols in the United States that continues to offer tours that go to the top of the dome. Visitors enter the dome by climbing 296 steps leading from the fifth floor to the top.

History

19th century
The land for Capitol Square was donated by Cyrus K. Holliday via his Topeka Town Company in 1862.  The master architect was Edward Townsend Mix with the wings designed by John G. Haskell. Construction on the East Wing began in 1866, using "native" limestone from Geary County, Kansas. Construction began on the West Wing in 1879 using limestone from Cottonwood Falls, Kansas and in 1881, the legislature authorized and appropriated funds for the construction of a central building to link the two wings. Construction of this central building began in 1886, and the contract for dome construction was let in May, 1889.

20th century

The building was declared officially complete in 1903, after 37 years of construction.

It was not until 1988 that a design for a sculpture to stand atop the dome was finally approved. Ad Astra, a  bronze sculpture weighing , was installed atop the dome on October 10, 2002. The sculpture, by Richard Bergen, depicts a Kansa Native American with bow and arrow pointed at the North Star and was chosen from 27 entries to adorn the dome. The title Ad Astra is Latin shortening of the state motto Ad Astra Per Aspera To the stars through difficulty.

21st century

The building was featured prominently on Kansas license plates issued from January 2001 until April 2007.

In December 2001, the Statehouse began a $120 million modernization project, led by Treanor Architects; the project included restoration of its first through fifth floors, the rehabilitation and expansion of its basement, restoration of its exterior masonry and copper roof/dome. By the time the project finished in spring 2014, scope creep and delays  resulted in a total cost of $332 million, covering "new heating and cooling systems, greater security and restroom accessibility, a new parking garage, visitor center, underground office space and replacing the roof and dome."

Frescos and murals 
In 1898, Jerome Fedeli painted frescos near the top of the dome in the rotunda.  Fedeli's work depicted bare-breasted classical women.  However officials referred to the paintings as "Nude Telephone Girls" and had them painted-over.

In the 1930s, John Steuart Curry painted murals on the second floor including the building's most famous painting—Tragic Prelude—which depicts an oversize and raging John Brown wedged between the warring sides of the American Civil War, flanked by flames and a tornado.  Curry's work gained considerable notoriety for depicting unsavory aspects of Kansas history and he left them unsigned and did not complete a commission to paint murals in the rotunda.  Curry's depiction of Brown is believed to be the only instance of a person convicted of treason being featured in a state capitol.

David Hicks Overmyer painted a series of murals in the first floor rotunda between 1951 and 1953 entitled The Coming of the Spaniards, The Battle of Arickaree,  The Battle of Mine Creek, Building a Sod House, Lewis and Clark in Kansas, Westward Ho, Arrival of the Railroad, and Chisholm Trail. 

From 1976 to 1978, Lumen Martin Winter painted the murals in the rotunda.

See also
 List of state and territorial capitols in the United States
 List of tallest domes
 Kansas Museum of History

References

External links

 Kansas State Capitol - Kansas Historical Society
 Historic Guided Tour of Capitol
 Photo Gallery of Kansas Statehouse construction wrapping up, from Lawrence Journal-World
 , from Hatteberg's People on KAKE TV news
 Publications concerning the Kansas State Capitol building available via the KGI Online Library

Buildings and structures in Topeka, Kansas
Government buildings with domes
State Capitol
Government buildings on the National Register of Historic Places in Kansas
State Capitol
History museums in Kansas
Museums in Topeka, Kansas
State capitols in the United States
Tourist attractions in Topeka, Kansas
1866 establishments in Kansas
National Register of Historic Places in Topeka, Kansas
Capitols of Kansas